Min-woo is a Korean masculine given name. Its meaning depends on the hanja used to write each syllable of the name. There are 27 hanja with the reading "min" and 41 hanja with the reading "woo" on the South Korean government's official list of hanja which may be registered for use in given names.

People
People with this name include:

Entertainers
Lee Min-woo (actor) (born Lee Dong-min, 1976), South Korean actor 
Lee Min-woo (born 1979), South Korean singer, member of Shinhwa
Seo Min-woo (1985–2018), South Korean singer, former member of boy band 100%
No Min-woo (born 1987), South Korean actor and singer, former member of rock band TraxX
Park Min-woo (actor) (born 1988), South Korean actor
Quan Minyu (Korean name Jun Min-woo, 2004–2016), Chinese child singer and dancer of Korean descent
Hwang Min-woo (born 2005), South Korean child actor

Sportspeople
Kim Min-woo (infielder) (born 1979), South Korean baseball player (Korea Baseball Organization)
Kim Min-woo (figure skater) (1986–2007), South Korean ice dancer
Kim Min-woo (footballer) (born 1990), South Korean football midfielder (J-League Division 2)
Cho Min-woo (born 1992), South Korean football centre back (J-League Division 2)
Jung Min-woo (born 1992), South Korean football forward (K-League 2)
Min Woo Lee (born 1998), Australian professional golfer of Korean descent
Park Min-woo (baseball) (born 1993), South Korean baseball player (Korea Baseball Organization)

Other
Hyung Min-woo (born 1974), South Korean manhwa artist

Fictional characters
Fictional characters with this name include:
Jang Min-woo, in 2012 South Korean television series To the Beautiful You (based on Hokuto Umeda)
Jo Min-woo, in 2010 South Korean television series Giant 
Kang Min-woo, in 2004 South Korean television series Forbidden Love
Lee Min-woo, in 2012 South Korean television series Golden Time 
Yoo Min-woo, in 2003 South Korean television series Summer Scent

See also
List of Korean given names

References

Korean masculine given names